Richard Herman may refer to:
 Richard Herman, chancellor of the University of Illinois at Urbana-Champaign
 Richard Herman (cricketer), Australian former cricketer

See also
Richard Herrmann, German footballer
Richard Herrmann (journalist), Norwegian journalist
Dick Hermann, American football linebacker
Richard Sherman (disambiguation)